Mary Oxlie or Oxley (fl. 1616) was a 17th-century Scottish or Northumbrian poet, known for one published verse.

The Encomium
Mary Oxlie of Morpeth is credited as the author of a commendatory poem of fifty-two lines, "To William Drummond of Hawthornden," which prefaced Edward Phillips' 1656 edition of Drummond's poems. Phillips was Drummond's brother-in-law.

In 1675, in a section of his Theatrum poetarum called "Women among the moderns eminent for poetry," Phillips describes "Mary Morpeth" as a "Scotch Poetess" who wrote "many other things in Poetry" (p. 259) apart from the dedication, though none of these other poems are now known. The 1656 ascription identifies her as Northumbrian. The original date of the poem is conjectural, though from internal evidence it would seem to have been 1616. 

She along with other women such as Anna Hume, may have been part of the Hawthornden literary circle or coterie: Phillips terms her "a friend of the Poet Drummond" (p. 259).

The poem opens with formulaic humility:

I Never rested on the Muses bed,
Nor dipt my Quill in the Thessalian Fountaine,
My rustick Muse was rudely fostered,
And flies too low to reach the double mountaine. (1-4)

The second verse clarifies that this "rusticity" is due in large part to the particular situation of the woman writer:

Perfection in a Woman's worke is rare
From an untroubled mind should Verses flow;
My discontents makes mine too muddy show;
And hoarse encumbrances of household care
Where these remaine, the muses ne're repaire. (6-10)   

Despite these caveats, the poem itself is generally agreed to be an accomplished pastoral that offers insight into the coterie culture of the period. The poem praises Drummond's skill as writer of flattering verse addressed to women but reserves greater adulation for his evocation of sorrow at the death of the "peerless prince" Henry Frederick, Prince of Wales. Drummond she wrote, might extinguish the sun's glorious taper and bring showers of rain.
But when thy Muse dissolv'd in show'rs,
Wailes that peerlesse Prince of ours,
Cropt by too untimely Fate,
Her mourning doth exasperate
Senselesse things to see thee moane,
Stones do weep, and Trees do groane,
Birds in aire, Fishes in flood,
Beasts in field forsake their food;
The Nymphs forgoing all their Bowers
Teare their Chaplets deckt with Flowers;
Sol himselfe with misty vapour
Hides from earth his glorious Taper,
And as mov'd to heare thee plaine
Shews his griefe in show'rs of raine.

Bibliography 
"To William Drummond of Hawthornden." Poems by that most famous wit William Drummond of Hawthornden. Ed. Edward Phillips (1656).
The Poems of William Drummond of Hawthornden (Edinburgh, 1832), pp. xiii-iv
Dunnigan, S. M. "Oxlie, Mary (fl. 1616)." Oxford Dictionary of National Biography. Ed. H. C. G. Matthew and Brian Harrison. Oxford: OUP, 2004. 20 Jan. 2007.
Greer, Germaine, et al., eds. "Mary Oxlie of Morpeth." Kissing the Rod: an anthology of seventeenth-century women's verse. Farrar Straus Giroux, 1988. 79–82.

References

17th-century Scottish women writers
17th-century Scottish writers
17th-century Scottish poets
17th-century English women writers
17th-century English writers
17th-century English poets
Scottish women writers
Scottish women poets
English women poets
Year of birth unknown
Year of death unknown